"Go On" is a song written by Mark Nesler and Tony Martin, and recorded by American country music artist George Strait.  It was released in July 2000 as the lead-off single from his self-titled album.

Content
The narrator lends a sympathetic ear to a woman who caught her ex-lover cheating. The narrator keeps interrupting her and then apologizes and tells her to "go on". The song hints at the beginning of a new relationship with the narrator and the woman.

Critical reception
An uncredited article from the Toledo Blade said that "Go On" was "typical of Strait's style on many of his mid-tempo songs[…]and the lyrics give a clever but mature view about life going on in the wake of a broken heart." Greg Crawford, in an article from the Orlando Sentinel, said that Strait "push[es] the rarely heard upper limits of his vocal range," and an uncredited Hartford Courant review wrote that the song had a "breezy chorus hook." Chuck Taylor in his review of the single for Billboard Magazine said that the song has a "conversational quality that almost makes listeners feel as if they are eavesdropping on a private discussion and privy to the beginnings of a blossoming new romance." He also said that Strait delivers the lyric effortlessly and that the song has a "lilting, inviting melody that is perfectly suited for summertime airwaves."

Chart performance
"Go On" debuted at number 38 on the U.S. Billboard Hot Country Singles & Tracks for the week of July 29, 2000. The song spent twenty-two weeks on the Billboard Hot Country Singles & Tracks (now Hot Country Songs) charts, peaking at number two and holding the position for three weeks. The song also reached number one on the RPM Country Tracks charts dated for the week ending October 16, 2000, and held that position for one week. The song's b-side, "Murder on Music Row", charted at number 38 on the country music charts within the same timespan.

Year-end charts

References

2000 singles
2000 songs
George Strait songs
Songs written by Tony Martin (songwriter)
Songs written by Mark Nesler
Song recordings produced by Tony Brown (record producer)
MCA Nashville Records singles